Sean Dickson may refer to:

Sean Dickson (born 1991), South African cricketer
 Sean Dickson (born 1967), Scottish vocalist of the Soup Dragons
 Sean Dickson (footballer) (born 1992), Scottish professional footballer for Stirling Albion F.C.

See also
Sean Dixon (disambiguation)